Magny-le-Hongre is a commune in the Seine-et-Marne department in the Île-de-France region in north-central France.
It is part of Val d'Europe Agglomération together with the communes of Bailly-Romainvilliers, Chessy, Coupvray and Serris. Its population is over 9,000 as of 2019.

Demographics
Inhabitants are called Hongrémaniens in French.

Education
There are four groups of preschools and elementary schools in Magny: Charles Fauvet, Éric Tabarly, Les Semailles, and Simone Veil. The commune has one junior high school, Collège Jacqueline de Romilly.

The area high school/sixth-form college is Lycée Emilie du Châtelet in Serris.

See also
Communes of the Seine-et-Marne department

References

External links

Official site 
1999 Land Use, from IAURIF (Institute for Urban Planning and Development of the Paris-Île-de-France région) 

Communes of Seine-et-Marne
Val d'Europe